Aryan (also Romanized as Āryān, ‘Oryān, ‘Orīān, and Oryān) is a village in Khavashod Rural District, Rud Ab District, Sabzevar County, Razavi Khorasan Province, Iran. At the 2006 census, its population was 560, in 155 families.

See also 

 List of cities, towns and villages in Razavi Khorasan Province

References 

Populated places in Sabzevar County